Caridina loehae is a freshwater shrimp from Sulawesi. It is known as mini blue bee and orange delight shrimp in the aquarium trade. It is endemic to the Malili lake system. It lives on rocky substrates at a maximal depth of 5 metres.

Threats
This species is currently under threat by pollution from human activities and a nickel mine and introduced fish like the flowerhorn cichlid and pacu.

References

Atyidae
Freshwater crustaceans of Asia
Endemic freshwater shrimp of Sulawesi
Crustaceans described in 1937